Vivian Frederick Maynard FitzSimons, born in Pietermaritzburg, was a notable herpetologist in South Africa. Also, he contributed to the collection of spermatophyte samples for the National Herbarium which has become part of the South African National Biodiversity Institute at the Pretoria National Botanical Garden. In 1937, together with Anna Amelia Obermeyer, he collected some of the earliest plant specimens from the Eastern Highlands of Rhodesia (now Zimbabwe).

Later, as director of the Transvaal Museum, he together with Charles Koch helped to establish the Namib Desert Research Institute in Gobabeb

Family
Vivian FitzSimons came from a family of naturalists. His father, Frederick William FitzSimons, and his mother Patricia Henrietta (née Russell), both immigrated to South Africa from Ireland.

His brother was Desmond Charles Fitzsimons, who in 1939 founded the Fitzsimons Snake Park (Durban) and was a leading distributor of snake antivenoms in South Africa.

Vivian FitzSimons attended the prestigious Grey High School in Port Elizabeth.

List of written works
Some of his writings include:
 1932. Preliminary descriptions of new forms of South African Reptilia and Amphibia, from the Vernay-Lang Kalahari Expedition, 1930. 
 1933. Description of five new lizards from the Transvaal and Southern Rhodesia.
 1938. Transvaal Museum Expedition to South-West Africa and Little Namaqualand, May to August 1937.
 1939. Descriptions of some new species and subspecies of lizards from South Africa.
 1941. Descriptions of some new lizards from South Africa and a frog from southern Rhodesia.
 1943. The lizards of South Africa. (Reprinted 1970).
 1948. Descriptions of two new frogs from Natal and a gecko from Astove Island.
 1958. with Charles Kimberlin Brain (1931–). A Short account of the Reptiles of the Kalahari Gemsbok National Park.
 1959. Some new reptiles from southern Africa and southern Angola.
 1962. Snakes of Southern Africa. 
 1970. A Field Guide to the Snakes of South Africa.

Notable posts
 Director of the Transvaal Museum  1946 - 1966
 President of the South African Museums Association in 1955

Species described
As a leading herpetologist at the Transvaal Museum, Vivian was involved in the original description of as many as 41 South African reptiles, including the following species.

1930. Bradypodion transvaalense – Transvaal dwarf chameleon
1930. Afroedura langi
1930. Afroedura marleyi – Pondo rock gecko
1930. Breviceps sylvestris – forest rain frog
1930. Platysaurus minor – Waterberg flat lizard
1930. Scelotes bidigittatus – a skink
1930. Scelotes limpopoensis – Limpopo burrowing skink
1930. Smaug vandami – Van Dam’s girdled lizard
1930. Smaug depressus – Zoutpansberg girdled lizard
1930. Zygaspis vandami (synonyms: Zygaspis violacea vandami, Amphisbaena vandami )
1932. Lygodactylus chobiensis – Chobe dwarf gecko
1932. Pelusios bechuanicus – Okavango mud turtle
1932. Phrynobatrachus mababiensis – Mababe puddle frog
1932. Rhinotyphlops boylei – Boyle's beaked blind snake
1932. Xenocalamus bicolor maculatus – slender quill-snouted snake subspecies
1933. Pachydactylus vansoni – Van Son's thick-toed gecko
1933. Vhembelacerta rupicola – Soutpansberg rock lizard
1937. Lygodactylus methueni – Methuen's dwarf gecko
1938. Goggia rupicola – Namaqualand dwarf leaf-toed gecko
1938. Namazonurus campbelli – Campbell's girdled lizard
1938. Pachydactylus kobosensis 
1938. Pachydactylus labialis – Calvinia thick-toed gecko, Western Cape thick-toed gecko
1938. Pachydactylus robertsi – large-scaled gecko, shielded thick-toed gecko
1938. Typhlacontias brevipes – FitzSimons' burrowing skink
1938. Afroedura namaquensis1939. Goggia microlepidota – small-scaled dwarf leaf-toed gecko
1939. Scelotes kasneri – Kasner's dwarf burrowing skink
1941. Acontias gariepensis1941. Acontias occidentalis1941. Hyperolius swynnertoni – an African reed frog
1941. Pachydactylus acuminatus1941. Platysaurus orientalis – Sekukune flat lizard
1943. Pseudocordylus transvaalensis1943. Pachydactylus monticolus = Pachydactylus geitje (Sparrman, 1778)
1946. Heleophryne orientalis – eastern ghost frog
1946. Xenocalamus bicolor australis– slender quill-snouted snake subspecies
1947. Cacosternum striatum –  striped caco
1947. Pseudocordylus spinosus  – prickly girdled lizard, near threatened
1947. Anhydrophryne hewitti – Hewitt's moss frog, Natal chirping frog, or yellow bandit frog
1957. Rhoptropus biporosus – Kaokoveld Namib day gecko 
1958. Lygodactylus bernardi – Bernard's dwarf gecko, Arnoult's dwarf gecko
1958. Smaug mossambicus – Mozambique girdled lizard
1959. Pachydactylus caraculicus  – Angolan banded thick-toed gecko
1959. Pachydactylus kochii = Colopus kochi (V. FitzSimons, 1959) – Koch's thick-toed gecko
1962. Leptotyphlops occidentalis – western thread snake

Eponyms
Vivian FitzSimons is commemorated in the scientific names of four reptiles.Chondrodactylus fitzsimonsiElapsoidea sundevallii fitzsimonsiPlatysaurus orientalis fitzsimonsiScelotes fitzsimonsiReferences

External ArticlesVhembelacerta rupicola. French language Wikipedia.Namazonurus campbelli''. French language Wikipedia.
"Vivian Fitzsimons". South African History Online.

South African herpetologists
1901 births
1975 deaths
South African naturalists
South African taxonomists
20th-century South African zoologists
20th-century naturalists
Women herpetologists
20th-century South African women scientists